Condorcet is a commune in the Drôme department in the Auvergne-Rhône-Alpes region in southeastern France.

Geography

History
The history of Condorcet begins in late antiquity.  An old local tradition holds that the ancient, ruined part of the village was once occupied by a forest sacred to druids. The monks of Cluny Abbey founded a priory in Condorcet in the 10th century (first attesting  the name as Condacense in pago Diens in 986 AD).  The counts of Die (Drôme) were the lords of Condorcet from the earliest days of feudalism.

Population

See also
 Communes of the Drôme department
 Condorcet method

References

Communes of Drôme